Eric R. Anderson (born May 31, 1956 in Spokane, Washington) was a Republican member of the Idaho State Representative representing District 1 in the A seat from 2004 to 2014.

Early life, education, and career
Anderson earned his bachelor's degree in political science and government from Eastern Washington University.

Idaho House of Representatives

Committee assignments
Commerce and Human Resources Committee from 2004-2006
Environment, Energy, and Technology Committee from 2004-2014
State Affairs Committee from 2004-2014 
Business Committee from 2006-2008
Resources and Conversation Committee from 2012-2014
Ways and Means Committee from 2012-2014, serving as chairman

Elections

References

External links
 Eric R. Anderson at the Idaho Legislature
 
 Biography at Ballotpedia
 Financial information (state office) at the National Institute for Money in State Politics

1956 births
Living people
Eastern Washington University alumni
Republican Party members of the Idaho House of Representatives
People from Bonner County, Idaho
Politicians from Spokane, Washington